Bartee is a surname. Notable people with the surname include:

 Kimera Bartee (1972–2021), American baseball player and coach
 William Bartee (born 1977), American football player

See also
 Barte
 Barter (surname)
 Barty